Dentin phosphoprotein, or phosphophoryn, is one of three proteins formed from dentin sialophosphoprotein and is important in the regulation of mineralization of dentin.

Phosphophoryn is the most acidic protein ever discovered and has an isoelectric point of 1. This extreme acidity is achieved by its amino acid sequence. Many portions of its chain are repeating -D-S-S- (aspartic acid-serine-serine) sequences. In protein chemistry, net acidity equates to negative charge. Being highly negative, dentin phosphoprotein is able to attract large amounts of calcium. In vitro studies also indicate phosphophoryn can initiate hydroxyapatite formation.

References

Teeth
Proteins